Spirit, also known as Iluka, was a proposed residential skyscraper under construction on the Gold Coast in Queensland, Australia. Upon completion, it would have become the tallest building in Australia to roof, and the second tallest building overall (surpassed by the nearby Q1). The site was sold in March 2019 with only basement level work completed. 

Spirit would have consisted of 470 residential apartments, across 89 levels, and would have further included 6 basement levels. The AUD$1.2 billion skyscraper received planning approval by the Gold Coast City Council in September 2015, with construction commencing at March 2016, and intended to finish by 2020.

In March 2019, Forise sold the site for $50-60 million at an estimated loss of $50 million, as Forise purchased the former Iluka tower for $65 million and then spent approximately $40 million on initial work at the basement level.

See also

 List of tallest buildings on the Gold Coast

References

External links 
 Spirit — on CTBUH Skyscraper Center

Residential skyscrapers in Australia
Proposed skyscrapers in Australia
Surfers Paradise, Queensland
Buildings and structures under construction in Australia